Winston Lewis Prouty (September 1, 1906September 10, 1971) was an American politician. A member of the Republican Party, he served as a United States Senator from Vermont from 1959 until his death. He was previously a member of the United States House of Representatives, serving Vermont's At-large congressional district, from 1951 to 1959.

Early life and education
Winston Prouty was born in Newport, Vermont, to Willard Robert and Margaret (née Lockhart) Prouty. His family owned Prouty & Miller Lumber Company, a lumber and building material business. His family was also involved in politics; his father and grandfather both served as state legislators. His uncle Charles A. Prouty was a member of the Interstate Commerce Commission, and another uncle, George H. Prouty served as Governor of Vermont from 1908 to 1910.

Prouty received his early education at public schools in Newport, and attended St. Paul's School in Garden City, New York and Bordentown Military Institute in New Jersey. He then studied engineering at Lafayette College in Easton, Pennsylvania, from 1925 to 1927. During his college years, he became a member of the Delta Upsilon fraternity.

Early career
Prouty returned to Newport and joined his family's business, Prouty & Miller.  He also served as a director of the National Bank of Newport and Associated Industries of Vermont.  Though described as shy and reticent, in part because he was self-conscious about the loss of his right thumb in an accident at his family's business, Prouty decided on a career in politics.  A Republican, he was a member of the Newport City Council from 1933 to 1937.  He served as mayor of Newport from 1938 to 1941. He was elected to the Vermont House of Representatives in 1940, and served from 1941 to 1949. During his last two years in the legislature, he served as Speaker of the House. He was an unsuccessful candidate for the Republican nomination for Lieutenant Governor of Vermont in 1948, losing to Harold J. Arthur. From 1949 to 1950, he served as chairman of the state Water Conservation Board.

Congressional career

House of Representatives
In 1950, after longtime incumbent Charles Albert Plumley decided not to run again, Prouty announced his candidacy for the United States House of Representatives from Vermont's At-large congressional district. He won the Republican nomination in a four-way race that included Governor Arthur. In the general election, he defeated his Democratic opponent, Herbert B. Comings, by a margin of 73%-26%. He was subsequently re-elected to three more terms, never receiving less than 61% of the vote.  During his tenure in the House, Prouty served as a member of the Veterans Affairs Committee and House Foreign Affairs Committee.  He was an advocate for the creation of the Saint Lawrence Seaway. During his tenure in the House, Prouty voted in favor of the Civil Rights Act of 1957.

Senate
He was elected to the United States Senate in 1958; he reelected in 1964 and 1970 and served from January 3, 1959 until his death.  In the Senate, Prouty's committee assignments included District of Columbia, Rules, Labor and Public Welfare, and Commerce, in addition to the Special Committee on Aging and the Select Committee on Small Business.  Issues with which he was identified included federal aid for school construction, federal funding of courses for students with special needs, arts and music education, and senior citizen needs to include health care and expansion of Social Security eligibility.  In addition, he was a longtime advocate for returning passenger rail service to Vermont.  As the ranking Republican on the District of Columbia Committee, Prouty sponsored the legislation that created the district's Delegate to Congress. During his tenure in the Senate, Prouty voted in favor of the Civil Rights Acts of 1960, 1964, and 1968, as well as the 24th Amendment to the U.S. Constitution, the Voting Rights Act of 1965, and the confirmation of Thurgood Marshall to the U.S. Supreme Court.

Death and burial
Prouty died from the effects of gastric cancer at New England Deaconess Hospital in Boston on September 10, 1971.  He was buried at Pine Grove Cemetery in Newport.

Family
In 1939, Prouty married Frances Currie Hearle Backus (1907-1960) of Stanstead, Quebec, who was the mother of three daughters from a previous marriage, Currie, Elizabeth, and Ann.  She died in 1960, and in 1962, Prouty married Jennette Herbert Hall (1913-2002), who had been the chief aide to Congressmen Henry J. Latham of New York and Robert E. Cook of Ohio.

Honors
In 1966, Prouty received the honorary degree of LL.D. from Lafayette College.

See also
 List of United States Congress members who died in office (1950–99)

References

External links
 
 

1906 births
1971 deaths
Bordentown Military Institute alumni
Lafayette College alumni
People from Newport (city), Vermont
Republican Party members of the Vermont House of Representatives
Deaths from cancer in Massachusetts
Deaths from stomach cancer
Republican Party United States senators from Vermont
Burials in Vermont
Republican Party members of the United States House of Representatives from Vermont
20th-century American politicians
Speakers of the Vermont House of Representatives